Banka Behary Das (1923-2001) was an Indian politician, a Member of Parliament, representing Odisha in the Rajya Sabha the upper house of India's Parliament as a member of the Praja Socialist Party.

References

Rajya Sabha members from Odisha
Praja Socialist Party politicians
1923 births
2001 deaths